Gentoo, also spelled Gentue or Jentue, was a term used by Europeans for the native inhabitants of India before the word Hindu, with its religious connotation, was used to distinguish a group from Muslims and members of other religious groups in India.

Gentio and Gentoo terms were applied historically to indigenous peoples of India; later, to Telugu-speaking persons and their language in then Madras Province (now the Andhra region), as opposed to the Malbars, or Tamil speakers and their language (in what is now Tamil Nadu). An example from the Monsignor Sebastiao Rodolfo Dalgado is "moros, gentivos e maos christãos".
It was also an Anglo-Indian slang term used in the 17th and 18th centuries; however, in the 20th century, the word became derogatory.

Etymology

It is unclear why Indians were called Gentoo. As Portuguese people arrived in India for trade, religious conversions, and colonisation before other Europeans, it is possible that the word was derived from the Portuguese word Gentio: a gentile, a heathen, or native. The Portuguese also appear to have used it to distinguish the inhabitants of India from Muslims, the Moros or Moors.

According to 19th century philologist and Orientalist N.B. Halhed, there was a fanciful derivation of Gentoo from the Sanskrit word jantu, meaning "creature".

The word Hindu is not originally Indian. Instead, the word Hindu started to acquire religious connotations only after the arrival of Muslims. The very first attempt by the British to establish social laws on the Indian subcontinent for administrative purposes (in order to assert the distinctiveness of Indian jurisprudence) was named A Code of Gentoo Law. The first digest of Indian legislation was published in 1776, was funded by the East India Company, supported by Warren Hastings, and was translated from Persian into English by Halhed.

After the term Hindu as a religion was established to represent non-Muslims and non-Christians, the word Gentoo became archaic and then obsolete, while its application on Telugu people and Telugu language (present Andhra region, part of Andhra Pradesh) in then Madras Province continued to distinguish them from Tamil people and Tamil language or Malbars (present: Tamil Nadu) in then Madras Province.

See also
Anglo-Hindu law
The Asiatic Society
Hindoo

References

External links
William Jones and Representations of Hinduism in British Poetry - Author: Kurt Andrew Johnson
The Works Of The Right Honourable Edmund Burke, Vol. IX. (of 12) - Author: Edmund Burke

Scheduled Tribes of India
Ethnic groups in India
Ethnic and religious slurs
Political metaphors referring to people